Richard Francisco Catrileo Cifuentes (born 26 June 1992) was a Chilean footballer. His last club was San Marcos de Arica.

References
 
 

1992 births
Living people
Chilean people of Mapuche descent
Mapuche sportspeople
Indigenous sportspeople of the Americas
Chilean footballers
Cobreloa footballers
Rangers de Talca footballers
Primera B de Chile players
Chilean Primera División players
Association football midfielders